X is the first mixtape of South Korean rapper pH-1. It was released on May 8, 2020 by H1GHR MUSIC.

Music and lyrics 
X features various styles of rapping instead of the soft melodic rap of pH-1's previous songs. In the lead singles "PACKITUP!" and "Anymore", pH-1 busts out of his previous soft image and shows off the unpretentious and masculine side of his personality.

Critical reception 
Hwang Duha of Rhythmer rated X 3.5 of 5 stars.

Track listing

Charts

Sales

References 

2020 mixtape albums
Korean-language albums
Hip hop albums by South Korean artists